Werdenbergersee is a small lake in Buchs, below the town of Werdenberg, in the municipality of Grabs, Canton of St. Gallen, Switzerland.

External links

Werdenberger
Lakes of the canton of St. Gallen